A. digitata may refer to:
 Adansonia digitata, the baobab, a tree species found in the hot, dry savannahs of sub-Saharan Africa
 Aechmea digitata, a plant species endemic to Brazil

See also